K97 or K-97 may refer to:

K-97 (Kansas highway), a former state highway in Kansas
CIRK-FM, a radio station